Rule High School or Rule School  is a public high school located in Rule, Texas (USA). It is part of the Rule Independent School District located in western Haskell County and classified as a 1A school by the UIL. In 2013, the school was rated "Met Standard" by the Texas Education Agency.

Athletics
The Rule Bobcats compete in the following sports:

Basketball
Cross Country
6-Man Football
Tennis
Track and Field

State Titles
Boys Track 
1971(B), 1973(B), 1974(B), 2007(1A), 2008(1A)
One Act Play 
1995(1A)

State Finalists
Football 
1973(B), 2006(6M/D1), 2007(6M/D1)

Academics
UIL Academic Meet Champions 
1996(1A), 1997(1A)

Notable Alumnus
Art Briles - is an American football coach and former player.  He is the former head football coach at Baylor University.

See also

List of high schools in Texas
List of Six-man football stadiums in Texas

References

External links
Rule ISD

Public high schools in Texas
Public middle schools in Texas
Public elementary schools in Texas